P. venosum may refer to:

Pelargonium × venosum, a geranium
Polyphlebium venosum, a filmy fern